may refer to:
Radical 194 in the  Kangxi Dictionary
Ghosts in Chinese culture
a demon in Japanese culture, see Oni
in traditional Chinese astronomy, an asterism in the modern constellation of Cancer, see Ghost (Chinese constellation)

See also
Oni (disambiguation)
Foreign devil

Disambiguation pages with Chinese character titles